The Quebec Caribou were a rugby union club based in Montreal, Quebec, Canada. Drawing players from rugby clubs throughout Quebec, the Caribou competed against other provincial teams in the Rugby Canada Super League.

Rugby union teams in Quebec
Rugby union teams in Montreal